Zhou Yuanxiang (born 30 January 1964) is a Chinese athlete. She competed in the women's javelin throw at the 1988 Summer Olympics.

References

1964 births
Living people
Athletes (track and field) at the 1988 Summer Olympics
Chinese female javelin throwers
Olympic athletes of China